Robert Gary Dickson is a lawyer and former member of the Legislative Assembly of Alberta  and the first Saskatchewan Information and Privacy Commissioner.

Dickson was first elected as a member of the Alberta Liberal Party in a 1992 by-election that had been called after the death of popular MLA Sheldon Chumir, defeating Rod Love, a well-known political consultant. He went on to be re-elected for two more terms in the 1993 and 1997 general elections, and retired from the legislature in 2001.

On November 1, 2003 he was appointed as the first Information and Privacy Commissioner in Saskatchewan.

References

External links
 Gary Dickson biography Saskatchewan Government
 Legislative Assembly of Saskatchewan media release Gary Dickson's appointment

Alberta Liberal Party MLAs
Living people
Year of birth missing (living people)